Beauty No. 1 is a 1965 film by Andy Warhol starring Edie Sedgwick, Kip Stagg a.k.a.Bima Stagg, and Chuck Wein.

Synopsis and background
Beauty No. 1 is a precursor to Andy Warhol's better known follow up, Beauty No. 2 and was originally titled Beauty.

The movie features Edie Sedgwick, Chuck Wein, and Kip Stagg, a.k.a. Bima Stagg. The film has a fixed point of view showing a bed with two characters on it, Sedgwick and Stagg. Chuck Wein is heard speaking but is just out of view. Sedgwick, in a skimpy outfit of bra and panties, and Stagg, wearing only jockey shorts, engage in flirting and light kissing. Wein asks Sedgwick questions seemingly designed to harass and annoy her. Stagg is more or less a bystander not interacting with Wein.

After dissatisfaction with performances in the first shoot, Warhol re-cast and re-shot Beauty as Beauty No. 2, with Edie Sedgwick, Chuck Wein and Gino Piserchio reprising the role of Kip Stagg.

The dialogue seems as if it were created ad lib and no conclusions are reached in the film.

The original film negative is maintained by the Andy Warhol Museum.

References

See also
List of American films of 1965
 Andy Warhol filmography

1965 films
Films directed by Andy Warhol
1960s English-language films
1960s American films